A grant deed is used in some states and jurisdictions for the sale or other transfer of real property from one person or entity to another person or entity.  Each party transferring an interest in the property, or "grantor", is required to sign it.  The signatures must be acknowledged before a notary public (notarized) or other official authorized by law to administer oaths.

The grantor of a grant deed makes two guarantees to the grantee: 1) The grantor/seller guarantees that the property has not been sold to anyone else, and 2) That the house is not under any liens or restrictions that have not already been disclosed to the buyer/grantee. This assures grantee there are no legal claims to the property by third parties, and no taxes are owed on the property that would restrict its sale.

Some jurisdictions use the warranty deed to transfer real property instead of the grant deed.  The warranty deed adds the additional guarantee that the grantor will defend the title against any third-party claim.   The quitclaim deed is also sometimes used, although this document is most often used to disclaim any interest in a property rather than selling a property that one owns.

The types of deeds that are now used to transfer real property are a relatively modern invention.  Previously, the grantor transferred the property to the buyer, called the "grantee", by performing some commonly recognized deed, such as picking up a handful of soil of the property to be transferred, handing it to the buyer, and reciting legally prescribed words that acknowledged the transfer in the presence of witnesses.  This was called livery of seisin.  Over time, and particularly with the development of modern technology that permits government offices to keep accurate copies of documents, the physical deed that was formerly performed in order to transfer a property was replaced by the paper deed, also known as a deed poll, that is now commonly used.

See also
Deed

Common law legal terminology
Property law
Property
Real property law
Personal property law
Property law legal terminology